Hussain Fazal (born 21 October 1906, date of death unknown) was an Afghanistan field hockey player, who competed at the 1936 Summer Olympic Games and played in both games.

References

External links
 

Afghan male field hockey players
Olympic field hockey players of Afghanistan
Field hockey players at the 1936 Summer Olympics
1906 births
Year of death missing